Bucks is an unincorporated community and census-designated place (CDP) in Mobile County, Alabama, United States. As of the 2020 census, its population was 22, down from 32 at the 2010 census. It is located in the northeastern section of the county near the Mobile River, along U.S. Route 43. The James M. Barry Electric Generating Plant, a coal- and natural gas-fired power station operated by Alabama Power, is located in Bucks.

Demographics

In 2010, Bucks had a population of 32. The racial and ethnic composition of the population was 59.4% white, 31.3% black or African American, 3.1% Native American, 6.3% from two or more races and 3.1% Hispanic or Latino of any race.

Geography
U.S. Route 43, the only highway through the community, leads south  to Mobile and north  to Mount Vernon.

The Mobile River forms the eastern edge of the community.

Education
Residents are zoned to Mobile County Public School System campuses. Residents are zoned to Citronelle High School.

References

Census-designated places in Alabama
Unincorporated communities in Alabama
Census-designated places in Mobile County, Alabama